Sirya is one of the 44 union councils, administrative subdivisions, of Haripur District in the Khyber Pakhtunkhwa province of Pakistan. Sirya is located at 33°56'14N 72°53'27E and lies to the south of the district capital Haripur

Secratry Javed is the current Nazim of the Sirya Union council.

References 

Union councils of Haripur District